White Bear is an unincorporated community in Marion County, in the U.S. state of Missouri.

History
Variant names were Bear Creek, Bear Creek Station, and Whiteledge. A post office called White Ledge was established in 1892, and remained in operation until 1904. White Bear was named for a product made by a local lime kiln.

References

Unincorporated communities in Marion County, Missouri
Unincorporated communities in Missouri